Christoph Pöstinger (born 7 April 1972 in Vienna) is a retired Austrian sprinter who competed primarily in the 200 metres. He represented his country at the 1992 and 1996 Summer Olympics, as well as one outdoor and two indoor World Championships.

He still holds national records on several distances.

Competition record

Personal bests
Outdoor
100 metres – 10.22 (+1.1 m/s, Linz 1992)
200 metres – 20.45 (Ebensee 1996) NR
400 metres – 45.80 (+0.8 m/s, Byrkjelo 1997)
110 metres hurdles – 14.17 (-0.5 m/s) (Villach 1991)
Indoor
60 metres – 6.78 (Karlsruhe 1996)
200 metres – 20.82 (Vienna 1996) NR
400 metres – 46.14 (Chemnitz 1999) NR

References

All-Athletics profile

1972 births
Living people
Austrian male sprinters
Athletes (track and field) at the 1992 Summer Olympics
Athletes (track and field) at the 1996 Summer Olympics
Olympic athletes of Austria
Athletes from Vienna